Jean-Louis Lebris de Kérouac (March 12, 1922 – October 21, 1969), known as Jack Kerouac, was an American novelist and poet who, alongside William S. Burroughs and Allen Ginsberg, was a pioneer of the Beat Generation.

Of French-Canadian ancestry, Kerouac was raised in a French-speaking home in Lowell, Massachusetts. He "learned English at age six and spoke with a marked accent into his late teens." During World War II, he served in the United States Merchant Marine; he completed his first novel at the time, which was published more than 40 years after his death. His first published book was The Town and the City (1950), and he achieved widespread fame and notoriety with his second, On the Road, in 1957. It made him a beat icon, and he went on to publish 12 more novels and numerous poetry volumes.

Kerouac is recognized for his style of spontaneous prose. Thematically, his work covers topics such as his Catholic spirituality, jazz, travel, promiscuity, life in New York City, Buddhism, drugs, and poverty. He became an underground celebrity and, with other Beats, a progenitor of the hippie movement, although he remained antagonistic toward some of its politically radical elements. He has a lasting legacy, greatly influencing many of the cultural icons of the 1960s, including Bob Dylan, the Beatles, Jerry Garcia and the Doors.

In 1969, at the age of 47, Kerouac died from an abdominal hemorrhage caused by a lifetime of heavy drinking. Since then, his literary prestige has grown, and several previously unseen works have been published.

Biography

Early life and adolescence

Kerouac was born on March 12, 1922, in Lowell, Massachusetts, to French Canadian parents, Léo-Alcide Kéroack (1889–1946) and Gabrielle-Ange Lévesque (1895–1973).

There is some confusion surrounding his name, partly because of variations on the spelling of Kerouac, and because of Kerouac's own statement of his name as Jean-Louis Lebris de Kerouac. His reason for that statement seems to be linked to an old family legend that the Kerouacs had descended from Baron François Louis Alexandre Lebris de Kerouac. Kerouac's baptism certificate lists his name simply as Jean Louis Kirouac, the most common spelling of the name in Quebec. Research has shown that Kerouac's roots were indeed in Brittany, and he was descended from a middle-class merchant colonist, Urbain-François Le Bihan, Sieur de Kervoac, whose sons married French Canadians.

Kerouac's father Leo had been born into a family of potato farmers in the village of Saint-Hubert-de-Rivière-du-Loup, Quebec. Jack also had various stories on the etymology of his surname, usually tracing it to Irish, Breton, Cornish, or other Celtic roots. In one interview he claimed it was from the name of the Cornish language (Kernewek), and that the Kerouacs had fled from Cornwall to Brittany. Another version was that the Kerouacs had come to Cornwall from Ireland before the time of Christ and the name meant "language of the house". In still another interview he said it was an Irish word for "language of the water" and related to Kerwick. Kerouac, derived from Kervoach, is the name of a town in Brittany in Lanmeur, near Morlaix.

Jack Kerouac later referred to 34 Beaulieu Street as "sad Beaulieu". The Kerouac family was living there in 1926 when Jack's older brother Gerard died of rheumatic fever, aged nine. This deeply affected four-year-old Jack, who later said Gerard followed him in life as a guardian angel. This is the Gerard of Kerouac's novel Visions of Gerard. He had one other sibling, an older sister named Caroline. Kerouac was referred to as Ti Jean or little John around the house during his childhood.

Kerouac spoke French with his family and began learning English at school, around age six; he began speaking it confidently in his late teens. He was a serious child who was devoted to his mother, who played an important role in his life. She was a devout Catholic, who instilled this deep faith into both her sons. He later said she was the only woman he ever loved. After Gerard died, his mother sought solace in her faith, while his father abandoned it, wallowing in drinking, gambling, and smoking.

Some of Kerouac's poetry was written in French, and in letters written to friend Allen Ginsberg towards the end of his life, he expressed a desire to speak his parents' native tongue again. In 2016, a whole volume of previously unpublished works originally written in French by Kerouac was published as La vie est d'hommage.

On May 17, 1928, while six years old, Kerouac made his first Confession. For penance, he was told to say a rosary, during which he heard God tell him that he had a good soul, that he would suffer in life and die in pain and horror, but would in the end receive salvation. This experience, along with his dying brother's vision of the Virgin Mary (as the nuns fawned over him, convinced he was a saint), combined with a later study of Buddhism and an ongoing commitment to Christ, solidified the worldview which informed his work.

Kerouac once told Ted Berrigan, in an interview for The Paris Review, of an incident in the 1940s in which his mother and father were walking together in a Jewish neighborhood on the Lower East Side of New York. He recalled "a whole bunch of rabbis walking arm in arm ... teedah- teedah – teedah ... and they wouldn't part for this Christian man and his wife, so my father went POOM! and knocked a rabbi right in the gutter." Leo, after the death of his child, also treated a priest with similar contempt, angrily throwing him out of the house despite his invitation from Gabrielle.

Kerouac was a capable athlete in football and wrestling. Kerouac's skills as running back in football for Lowell High School earned him scholarship offers from Boston College, Notre Dame, and Columbia University. He spent a year at Horace Mann School, where he befriended Seymour Wyse, an Englishman whom he later featured as a character, under the pseudonym 'Lionel Smart', in several of Kerouac's books. He also cites Wyse as the person who introduced him to the new styles of jazz, including Bop. After his year at Horace Mann, Kerouac earned the requisite grades for entry to Columbia. Kerouac broke a leg playing football during his freshman season, and during an abbreviated second year he argued constantly with coach Lou Little, who kept him benched. While at Columbia, Kerouac wrote several sports articles for the student newspaper, the Columbia Daily Spectator, and joined the Phi Gamma Delta fraternity. He was a resident of Livingston Hall and Hartley Hall, where other Beat Generation figures lived. He also studied at The New School.

Early adulthood

When his football career at Columbia ended, Kerouac dropped out of the university. He continued to live for a time in New York's Upper West Side with his girlfriend and future first wife, Edie Parker. It was during this time that he first met the Beat Generation figures who shaped his legacy and became characters in many of his novels, such as Allen Ginsberg, Neal Cassady, John Clellon Holmes, Herbert Huncke, Lucien Carr, and William S. Burroughs.

Kerouac was a United States Merchant Mariner from July to October 1942 and served on the SS Dorchester before her maiden voyage. A few months later, the SS Dorchester was sunk during a submarine attack while crossing the Atlantic, and several of his former shipmates were lost. In 1943 he joined the United States Navy Reserves. He served eight days of active duty with the Navy before arriving on the sick list. According to his medical report, Kerouac said he "asked for an aspirin for his headaches and they diagnosed me dementia praecox and sent me here." The medical examiner reported that Kerouac's military adjustment was poor, quoting Kerouac: "I just can't stand it; I like to be by myself." Two days later he was honorably discharged on the psychiatric grounds that he was of "indifferent character" with a diagnosis of "schizoid personality".

While a Merchant Mariner in 1942, Kerouac wrote his first novel, The Sea Is My Brother. The book was published in 2011, 70 years after it was written and over 40 years after Kerouac's death. Kerouac described the work as being about "man's simple revolt from society as it is, with the inequalities, frustration, and self-inflicted agonies." He viewed the work as a failure, calling it a "crock as literature" and never actively seeking to publish it.

In 1944, Kerouac was arrested as a material witness in the murder of David Kammerer, who had been stalking Kerouac's friend Lucien Carr since Carr was a teenager in St. Louis. William Burroughs was also a native of St. Louis, and it was through Carr that Kerouac came to know both Burroughs and Allen Ginsberg. According to Carr, Kammerer's homosexual obsession turned aggressive, finally provoking Carr to stab him to death in self-defense. Carr dumped the body in the Hudson River. Afterwards, Carr sought help from Kerouac. Kerouac disposed of the murder weapon and buried Kammerer's eyeglasses. Carr, encouraged by Burroughs, turned himself in to the police. Kerouac and Burroughs were later arrested as material witnesses. Kerouac's father refused to pay his bail. Kerouac then agreed to marry Edie Parker if her parents would pay the bail. (Their marriage was annulled in 1948.) Kerouac and Burroughs collaborated on a novel about the Kammerer killing entitled And the Hippos Were Boiled in Their Tanks. Though the book was not published during their lifetimes, an excerpt eventually appeared in Word Virus: The William S. Burroughs Reader (and as noted below, the novel was finally published late 2008). Kerouac also later wrote about the killing in his novel Vanity of Duluoz.

Later, Kerouac lived with his parents in the Ozone Park neighborhood of Queens, after they had also moved to New York. He wrote his first published novel, The Town and the City, and began On the Road around 1949 when living there. His friends jokingly called him "The Wizard of Ozone Park", alluding to Thomas Edison's nickname, "the Wizard of Menlo Park", and to the film The Wizard of Oz.

Early career: 1950–1957

The Town and the City was published in 1950 under the name "John Kerouac" and, though it earned him a few respectable reviews, the book sold poorly. Heavily influenced by Kerouac's reading of Thomas Wolfe, it reflects on the generational epic formula and the contrasts of small-town life versus the multi-dimensional, and larger life of the city. The book was heavily edited by Robert Giroux, with around 400 pages taken out.

For the next six years, Kerouac continued to write regularly. Building upon previous drafts tentatively titled "The Beat Generation" and "Gone on the Road," Kerouac completed what is now known as On the Road in April 1951, while living at 454 West 20th Street in Manhattan with his second wife, Joan Haverty. The book was largely autobiographical and describes Kerouac's road-trip adventures across the United States and Mexico with Neal Cassady in the late 40s and early 50s, as well as his relationships with other Beat writers and friends. Although some of the novel is focused on driving, Kerouac did not have a driver's license and Cassady did most of the cross-country driving. He learned to drive aged 34, but never had a formal license.

Kerouac completed the first version of the novel during a three-week extended session of spontaneous confessional prose. Kerouac wrote the final draft in 20 days, with Joan, his wife, supplying him with benzedrine, cigarettes, bowls of pea soup, and mugs of coffee to keep him going. This allowed him to type continuously without the interruption of reloading pages. The resulting manuscript contained no chapter or paragraph breaks and was much more explicit than the version which was eventually published. Though "spontaneous," Kerouac had prepared long in advance before beginning to write. In fact, according to his Columbia professor and mentor Mark Van Doren, he had outlined much of the work in his journals over the several preceding years.

Though the work was completed quickly, Kerouac had a long and difficult time finding a publisher. Before On the Road was accepted by Viking Press, Kerouac got a job as a "railroad brakeman and fire lookout" (see Desolation Peak (Washington)) traveling between the East and West coasts of the United States to earn money, frequently finding rest and the quiet space necessary for writing at the home of his mother. While employed in this way he met and befriended Abe Green, a young freight train jumper who later introduced Kerouac to Herbert Huncke, a Times Square street hustler and favorite of many Beat Generation writers. 

Publishers rejected On the Road because of its experimental writing style and its sexual content. Many editors were also uncomfortable with the idea of publishing a book that contained what were, for the era, graphic descriptions of drug use and homosexual behavior—a move that could result in obscenity charges being filed, a fate that later befell Burroughs' Naked Lunch and Ginsberg's Howl.

According to Kerouac, On the Road "was really a story about two Catholic buddies roaming the country in search of God. And we found him. I found him in the sky, in Market Street San Francisco (those 2 visions), and Dean (Neal) had God sweating out of his forehead all the way. THERE IS NO OTHER WAY OUT FOR THE HOLY MAN: HE MUST SWEAT FOR GOD. And once he has found Him, the Godhood of God is forever Established and really must not be spoken about." According to his biographer, historian Douglas Brinkley, On the Road has been misinterpreted as a tale of companions out looking for kicks, but the most important thing to comprehend is that Kerouac was an American Catholic author – for example, virtually every page of his diary bore a sketch of a crucifix, a prayer, or an appeal to Christ to be forgiven.

In the spring of 1951, while pregnant, Joan Haverty left and divorced Kerouac. In February 1952, she gave birth to Kerouac's only child, Jan Kerouac, whom he acknowledged as his daughter after a blood test confirmed it nine years later. For the next several years Kerouac continued writing and traveling, taking long trips through the U.S. and Mexico. He often experienced episodes of heavy drinking and depression. During this period, he finished drafts of what became ten more novels, including The Subterraneans, Doctor Sax, Tristessa, and Desolation Angels, which chronicle many of the events of these years.

In 1953, he lived mostly in New York City, having a brief but passionate affair with Alene Lee, an African-American woman, and member of the Beat generation. Alene was the basis for the character named "Mardou" in the novel The Subterraneans, and Irene May in Book of Dreams and Big Sur. At the request of his editors, Kerouac changed the setting of the novel from New York to San Francisco.

In 1954, Kerouac discovered Dwight Goddard's A Buddhist Bible at the San Jose Library, which marked the beginning of his study of Buddhism. Between 1955 and 1956, he lived on and off with his sister, whom he called "Nin," and her husband, Paul Blake, at their home outside of Rocky Mount, N.C. ("Testament, Va." in his works) where he meditated on, and studied, Buddhism. He wrote Some of the Dharma, an imaginative treatise on Buddhism, while living there. However, Kerouac had earlier taken an interest in Eastern thought. In 1946 he read Heinrich Zimmer's Myths and Symbols in Indian Art and Civilization. In 1955, Kerouac wrote a biography of Siddhartha Gautama, titled Wake Up: A Life of the Buddha, which was unpublished during his lifetime, but eventually serialized in Tricycle: The Buddhist Review, 1993–95. It was published by Viking in September 2008.

Kerouac found enemies on both sides of the political spectrum, the right disdaining his association with drugs and sexual libertinism and the left contemptuous of his anti-communism and Catholicism; characteristically, he watched the 1954 Senate McCarthy hearings smoking marijuana and rooting for the anti-communist crusader, Senator Joseph McCarthy. In Desolation Angels he wrote, "when I went to Columbia all they tried to teach us was Marx, as if I cared" (considering Marxism, like Freudianism, to be an illusory tangent).

In 1957, after being rejected by several other publishers, On the Road was finally purchased by Viking Press, which demanded major revisions prior to publication. Many of the most sexually explicit passages were removed and, fearing libel suits, pseudonyms were used for the book's "characters." These revisions have often led to criticisms of the alleged spontaneity of Kerouac's style.

Later career: 1957–1969
In July 1957, Kerouac moved to a small house at 1418½ Clouser Avenue in the College Park section of Orlando, Florida, to await the release of On the Road. Weeks later, a review of the book by Gilbert Millstein appeared in The New York Times proclaiming Kerouac the voice of a new generation. Kerouac was hailed as a major American writer. His friendship with Allen Ginsberg, William S. Burroughs and Gregory Corso, among others, became a notorious representation of the Beat Generation. The term Beat Generation was invented by Kerouac during a conversation held with fellow novelist Herbert Huncke. Huncke used the term "beat" to describe a person with little money and few prospects. Kerouac's fame came as an unmanageable surge that would ultimately be his undoing.

Kerouac's novel is often described as the defining work of the post-World War II Beat Generation and Kerouac came to be called "the king of the beat generation," a term with which he never felt comfortable. He once observed, "I'm not a beatnik. I'm a Catholic", showing the reporter a painting of Pope Paul VI and saying, "You know who painted that? Me."

The success of On the Road brought Kerouac instant fame. His celebrity status brought publishers desiring unwanted manuscripts that were previously rejected before its publication. After nine months, he no longer felt safe in public. He was badly beaten by three men outside the San Remo Cafe at 189 Bleecker Street in New York City one night. Neal Cassady, possibly as a result of his new notoriety as the central character of the book, was set up and arrested for selling marijuana.

In response, Kerouac chronicled parts of his own experience with Buddhism, as well as some of his adventures with Gary Snyder and other San Francisco-area poets, in The Dharma Bums, set in California and Washington and published in 1958. It was written in Orlando between November 26 and December 7, 1957. To begin writing Dharma Bums, Kerouac typed onto a ten-foot length of teleprinter paper, to avoid interrupting his flow for paper changes, as he had done six years previously for On the Road.

Kerouac was demoralized by criticism of Dharma Bums from such respected figures in the American field of Buddhism as Zen teachers Ruth Fuller Sasaki and Alan Watts. He wrote to Snyder, referring to a meeting with D.T. Suzuki, that "even Suzuki was looking at me through slitted eyes as though I was a monstrous imposter." He passed up the opportunity to reunite with Snyder in California, and explained to Philip Whalen "I'd be ashamed to confront you and Gary now I've become so decadent and drunk and don't give a shit. I'm not a Buddhist any more." In further reaction to their criticism, he quoted part of Abe Green's café recitation, Thrasonical Yawning in the Abattoir of the Soul: "A gaping, rabid congregation, eager to bathe, are washed over by the Font of Euphoria, and bask like protozoans in the celebrated light."

Kerouac also wrote and narrated a beat movie titled Pull My Daisy (1959), directed by Robert Frank and Alfred Leslie. It starred poets Allen Ginsberg and Gregory Corso, musician David Amram and painter Larry Rivers among others. Originally to be called The Beat Generation, the title was changed at the last moment when MGM released a film by the same name in July 1959 that sensationalized beatnik culture.

The television series Route 66 (1960–1964), featuring two untethered young men "on the road" in a Corvette seeking adventure and fueling their travels by apparently plentiful temporary jobs in the various U.S. locales framing the anthology-styled stories, gave the impression of being a commercially sanitized misappropriation of Kerouac's story model for On the Road. Even the leads, Buz and Todd, bore a resemblance to the dark, athletic Kerouac and the blonde Cassady/Moriarty, respectively. Kerouac felt he'd been conspicuously ripped off by Route 66 creator Stirling Silliphant and sought to sue him, CBS, the Screen Gems TV production company, and sponsor Chevrolet, but was somehow counseled against proceeding with what looked like a very potent cause of action.

John Antonelli's 1985 documentary Kerouac, the Movie begins and ends with footage of Kerouac reading from On the Road and Visions of Cody on The Steve Allen Show in November 1959.  In response to Allen's question "How would you define the word 'beat?'", Kerouac responds "well ... sympathetic."

In 1965, he met the poet Youenn Gwernig who was a Breton American like him in New York, and they became friends. Gwernig used to translate his Breton language poems into English so that Kerouac could read and understand them : "Meeting with Jack Kerouac in 1965, for instance, was a decisive turn. Since he could not speak Breton he asked me: 'Would you not write some of your poems in English? I'd really like to read them ! ... ' So I wrote an Diri Dir – Stairs of Steel for him, and kept on doing so. That's why I often write my poems in Breton, French and English."

During these years, Kerouac suffered the loss of his older sister to a heart attack in 1964 and his mother suffered a paralyzing stroke in 1966. In 1968, Neal Cassady also died while in Mexico.

Despite the role which his literary work played in inspiring the counterculture movement of the 1960s, Kerouac was openly critical of it. Arguments over the movement, which Kerouac believed was only an excuse to be "spiteful," also resulted in him splitting with Ginsberg by 1968.

Also in 1968, Kerouac last appeared on television, for Firing Line, produced and hosted by William F. Buckley Jr. (a friend of his from college). Seemingly intoxicated he affirmed his Catholicism and talked about the counterculture of the 1960s.

Death
On the morning of October 20, 1969, in St. Petersburg, Florida, Kerouac was working on a book about his father's print shop. He suddenly felt nauseated and went to the bathroom, where he began to vomit blood. Kerouac was taken to St. Anthony's Hospital, suffering from an esophageal hemorrhage. He received several transfusions in an attempt to make up for the loss of blood, and doctors subsequently attempted surgery, but a damaged liver prevented his blood from clotting. He never regained consciousness after the operation, and died at the hospital at 5:15 the following morning, at the age of 47. His cause of death was listed as an internal hemorrhage (bleeding esophageal varices) caused by cirrhosis, the result of longtime alcohol abuse. A possible contributing factor was an untreated hernia he suffered in a bar fight several weeks earlier. He is buried at Edson Cemetery in Lowell, Massachusetts.

At the time of his death, he was living with his third wife, Stella Sampas Kerouac, and his mother, Gabrielle. Kerouac's mother inherited most of his estate.

Style
Kerouac is generally considered to be the father of the Beat movement, although he actively disliked such labels. Kerouac's method was heavily influenced by the prolific explosion of
jazz, especially the Bebop genre established by Charlie Parker, Dizzy Gillespie, Thelonious Monk, and others. Later, Kerouac included ideas he developed from his Buddhist studies that began with Gary Snyder. He often referred to his style as "spontaneous prose." Although Kerouac's prose was spontaneous and purportedly without edits, he primarily wrote autobiographical novels (or roman à clef) based upon actual events from his life and the people with whom he interacted.

Many of his books exemplified this spontaneous approach, including On the Road, Visions of Cody, Visions of Gerard, Big Sur, and The Subterraneans. The central features of this writing method were the ideas of breath (borrowed from jazz and from Buddhist meditation breathing), improvising words over the inherent structures of mind and language, and limited revision. Connected with this idea of breath was the elimination of the period, substituting instead a long connecting dash. As such, the phrases occurring between dashes might resemble improvisational jazz licks. When spoken, the words take on a certain musical rhythm and tempo.

Kerouac greatly admired and was influenced by Gary Snyder. The Dharma Bums contains accounts of a mountain climbing trip Kerouac took with Snyder, and includes excerpts of letters from Snyder. While living with Snyder outside Mill Valley, California, in 1956, Kerouac worked on a book about him, which he considered calling Visions of Gary. (This eventually became Dharma Bums, which Kerouac described as "mostly about [Snyder].") That summer, Kerouac took a job as a fire lookout on Desolation Peak in the North Cascades in Washington, after hearing Snyder's and Whalen's stories of working as fire spotters. Kerouac described the experience in Desolation Angels and later in The Dharma Bums.

Kerouac would go on for hours, often drunk, to friends and strangers about his method. Allen Ginsberg, initially unimpressed, would later be one of his great proponents, and it was Kerouac's free-flowing prose method that inspired the composition of Ginsberg's poem Howl. It was at about the time of The Subterraneans that he was encouraged by Ginsberg and others to formally explain his style. Of his expositions of the Spontaneous Prose method, the most concise was Belief and Technique for Modern Prose, a list of 30 "essentials".

Some believed that at times Kerouac's writing technique did not produce lively or energetic prose. Truman Capote said of it, "That's not writing, it's typing". According to Carolyn Cassady and others, he constantly rewrote and revised his work.

Although the body of Kerouac's work has been published in English, recent research has shown that, in addition to his poetry and letters to friends and family, he also wrote unpublished works of fiction in French. The existence of his two novels written in French, La nuit est ma femme and Sur le chemin was revealed to the general public in a series of articles published by journalist Gabriel Anctil, in the Montreal newspaper Le Devoir in 2007 and 2008. All these works, including La nuit est ma femme, Sur le chemin, and large sections of Maggie Cassidy (originally written in French), have now been published together in a volume entitled La vie est d'hommage (Boréal, 2016) edited by University of Pennsylvania professor Jean-Christophe Cloutier. In 1996, the Nouvelle Revue Française had already published excerpts and an article on "La nuit est ma femme", and scholar Paul Maher Jr., in his biography Kerouac: His Life and Work',  discussed Sur le chemin. The novella, completed in five days in Mexico during December 1952, is a telling example of Kerouac's attempts at writing in his first language, a language he often called Canuck French.

Kerouac refers to this short novel in a letter addressed to Neal Cassady (who is commonly known as the inspiration for the character Dean Moriarty) dated January 10, 1953. The published novel runs over 110 pages, having been reconstituted from six distinct files in the Kerouac archive by Professor Cloutier. Set in 1935, mostly on the East Coast, it explores some of the recurring themes of Kerouac's literature by way of a spoken word narrative. Here, as with most of his French writings, Kerouac writes with little regard for grammar or spelling, often relying on phonetics in order to render an authentic reproduction of the French-Canadian vernacular. Even though this work has the same title as one of his best known English novels, it is the original French version of an incomplete translation that later became Old Bull in the Bowery (now published in The Unknown Kerouac from the Library of America). The Unknown Kerouac, edited by Todd Tietchen, includes Cloutier's translation of La nuit est ma femme and the completed translation of Sur le Chemin under the title Old Bull in the Bowery. La nuit est ma femme was written in early 1951 and completed a few days or weeks before he began the original English version of On the Road, as many scholars, such as Paul Maher Jr., Joyce Johnson, Hassan Melehy, and Gabriel Anctil have pointed out.

Influences 
Kerouac's early writing, particularly his first novel The Town and the City, was more conventional, and bore the strong influence of Thomas Wolfe. The technique Kerouac developed that later gained him notoriety was heavily influenced by jazz, especially Bebop, and later, Buddhism, as well as the Joan Anderson letter written by Neal Cassady. The Diamond Sutra was the most important Buddhist text for Kerouac, and "probably one of the three or four most influential things he ever read". In 1955, he began an intensive study of this sutra, in a repeating weekly cycle, devoting one day to each of the six Pāramitās, and the seventh to the concluding passage on Samādhi. This was his sole reading on Desolation Peak, and he hoped by this means to condition his mind to emptiness, and possibly to have a vision.

An often overlooked literary influence on Kerouac was James Joyce, whose work he alludes to more than any other author. Kerouac had high esteem for Joyce and he often used Joyce's stream-of-consciousness technique. Regarding On the Road, he wrote in a letter to Ginsberg, "I can tell you now as I look back on the flood of language. It is like Ulysses and should be treated with the same gravity." Additionally, Kerouac admired Joyce's experimental use of language, as seen in his novel Visions of Cody, which uses an unconventional narrative as well as a multiplicity of authorial voices.

Legacy 
Jack Kerouac and his literary works had a major impact on the popular rock music of the 1960s. Artists including Bob Dylan, The Beatles, Patti Smith, Tom Waits, The Grateful Dead, and The Doors all credit Kerouac as a significant influence on their music and lifestyles. This is especially so with members of the band The Doors, Jim Morrison and Ray Manzarek, who quote Jack Kerouac and his novel On the Road as one of the band's greatest influences. In his book Light My Fire: My Life with The Doors, Ray Manzarek (keyboard player of The Doors) wrote "I suppose if Jack Kerouac had never written On the Road, The Doors would never have existed." The alternative rock band 10,000 Maniacs wrote a song bearing his name, "Hey Jack Kerouac" on their 1987 album In My Tribe. The 2000 Barenaked Ladies song, "Baby Seat", from the album Maroon, references Kerouac.
Kerouac's sensibility and rock ‘n' roll each evolved from African-American influences.

As the critic Juan Arabia has written in relation to Kerouac's work and rock 'n' roll: 

In 1974, the Jack Kerouac School of Disembodied Poetics was opened in his honor by Allen Ginsberg and Anne Waldman at Naropa University, a private Buddhist university in Boulder, Colorado. The school offers a BA in Writing and Literature, MFAs in Writing & Poetics and Creative Writing, and a summer writing program.

From 1978 to 1992, Joy Walsh published 28 issues of a magazine devoted to Kerouac, Moody Street Irregulars.

Kerouac's French-Canadian origins inspired a 1987 National Film Board of Canada docudrama, Jack Kerouac's Road: A Franco-American Odyssey, directed by Acadian poet Herménégilde Chiasson. Other tributes in French Canada include the 1972 biography by novelist Victor-Lévy Beaulieu Jack Kérouac (essai-poulet), translated as Jack Kerouac: a chicken-essay, the second in a series of works by Beaulieu on his literary forefathers, and two songs that came out within months of each other in 1987 and 1988: "Sur la route" by Pierre Flynn, and "L'ange vagabond" by Richard Séguin.

In the mid-1980s, Kerouac Park was placed in downtown Lowell, Massachusetts.

A street, rue Jack-Kerouac, is named after him in Quebec City, as well as in the hamlet of Kerouac, Lanmeur, Brittany. An annual Kerouac festival was established in Lanmeur in 2010. In the 1980s, the city of San Francisco named a one-way street, Jack Kerouac Alley, in his honor in Chinatown.

The character Hank in David Cronenberg's 1991 film Naked Lunch is based on Kerouac.

In 1997, the house on Clouser Avenue where The Dharma Bums was written was purchased by a newly formed non-profit group, The Jack Kerouac Writers in Residence Project of Orlando, Inc. This group provides opportunities for aspiring writers to live in the same house in which Kerouac was inspired, with room and board covered for three months. In 1998, the Chicago Tribune published a story by journalist Oscar J. Corral that described a simmering legal dispute between Kerouac's family and the executor of daughter Jan Kerouac's estate, Gerald Nicosia. The article, citing legal documents, showed that Kerouac's estate, worth $91 at the time of his death, was worth $10 million in 1998.

In 2007, Kerouac was posthumously awarded an honorary Doctor of Letters degree from the University of Massachusetts Lowell.

In 2009, the movie One Fast Move or I'm Gone – Kerouac's Big Sur was released. It chronicles the time in Kerouac's life that led to his novel Big Sur, with actors, writers, artists, and close friends giving their insight into the book. The movie also describes the people and places on which Kerouac based his characters and settings, including the cabin in Bixby Canyon. An album released to accompany the movie, "One Fast Move or I'm Gone", features Benjamin Gibbard (Death Cab for Cutie) and Jay Farrar (Son Volt) performing songs based on Kerouac's Big Sur.

In 2010, during the first weekend of October, the 25th anniversary of the literary festival "Lowell Celebrates Kerouac" was held in Kerouac's birthplace of Lowell, Massachusetts. It featured walking tours, literary seminars, and musical performances focused on Kerouac's work and that of the Beat Generation.

In the 2010s, there was a surge in films based on the Beat Generation. Kerouac has been depicted in the films Howl and Kill Your Darlings. A feature film version of On the Road was released internationally in 2012, and was directed by Walter Salles and produced by Francis Ford Coppola. Independent filmmaker Michael Polish directed Big Sur, based on the novel, with Jean-Marc Barr cast as Kerouac. The film was released in 2013.

A species of Indian platygastrid wasp that is phoretic (hitch-hiking) on grasshoppers is named after him as Mantibaria kerouaci.

In October 2015, a crater on the planet Mercury was named in his honor.

The Cadets Drum and Bugle Corps based their 2022 production Rearview Mirror off of Kerouac's travels across America and his novel On the Road.

Works

Poetry
While he is best known for his novels, Kerouac is also noted for his poetry. Kerouac said that he wanted "to be considered as a jazz poet blowing a long blues in an afternoon jazz session on Sunday.". Many of Kerouac's poems follow the style of his free-flowing, uninhibited prose, also incorporating elements of jazz and Buddhism. "Mexico City Blues," a collection of poems published in 1959, is made up of 242 choruses following the rhythms of jazz. In much of his poetry, to achieve a jazz-like rhythm, Kerouac made use of the long dash in place of a period. Several examples of this can be seen in "Mexico City Blues":

Other well-known poems by Kerouac, such as "Bowery Blues," incorporate jazz rhythms with Buddhist themes of Saṃsāra, the cycle of life and death, and Samadhi, the concentration of composing the mind. Also, following the jazz / blues tradition, Kerouac's poetry features repetition and themes of the troubles and sense of loss experienced in life.

Posthumous editions
In 2007, to coincide with the 50th anniversary of On the Road publishing, Viking issued two new editions: On the Road: The Original Scroll and On the Road: 50th Anniversary Edition. By far the more significant is Scroll, a transcription of the original draft typed as one long paragraph on sheets of tracing paper which Kerouac taped together to form a  scroll. The text is more sexually explicit than Viking allowed to be published in 1957, and also uses the real names of Kerouac's friends rather than the fictional names he later substituted. Indianapolis Colts owner Jim Irsay paid $2.43 million for the original scroll and allowed an exhibition tour that concluded at the end of 2009. The other new issue, 50th Anniversary Edition, is a reissue of the 40th anniversary issue under an updated title.

The Kerouac/Burroughs manuscript And the Hippos Were Boiled in Their Tanks was published for the first time on November 1, 2008, by Grove Press. Previously, a fragment of the manuscript had been published in the Burroughs compendium, Word Virus.

Les Éditions du Boréal, a Montreal-based publishing house, obtained rights from Kerouac's estate to publish a collection of works titled La vie est d'hommage (it was released in April 2016). It includes 16 previously unpublished works, in French, including a novella, Sur le chemin, La nuit est ma femme, and large sections of Maggie Cassidy originally written in French. Both Sur le chemin and La nuit est ma femme have also been translated to English by Jean-Christophe Cloutier, in collaboration with Kerouac, and were published in 2016 by the Library of America in The Unknown Kerouac.

Literary Executorship and Representation 
Since 2017, John H. Shen-Sampas has been the chief literary executor for the estate of Jack Kerouac. Together with the University of Massachusetts at Lowell, Mr. Shen-Sampas has done instrumental work in preserving and archiving all aspects of Kerouac's life. Currently, the estate is represented by the Wylie Agency.

Discography

Studio albums
 Poetry for the Beat Generation (with Steve Allen) (1959)
 Blues and Haikus (with Al Cohn and Zoot Sims) (1959)
 Readings by Jack Kerouac on the Beat Generation (1960)

Compilation albums
 The Jack Kerouac Collection (1990) [Box] (Audio CD collection of three studio albums)
 Jack Kerouac Reads On the Road (1999)

References

Notes

Sources

Further reading 

 Amburm, Ellis. Subterranean Kerouac: The Hidden Life of Jack Kerouac. St. Martin's Press, 1999. .
 Amram, David. Offbeat: Collaborating with Kerouac. Thunder's Mouth Press, 2002. .
 Bartlett, Lee (ed.). The Beats: Essays in Criticism. London: McFarland, 1981.
 Beaulieu, Victor-Lévy. Jack Kerouac: A Chicken Essay. Coach House Press, 1975.
 Brooks, Ken. The Jack Kerouac Digest. Agenda, 2001.
 Cassady, Carolyn. Neal Cassady Collected Letters, 1944–1967. Penguin, 2004. .
 Cassady, Carolyn. Off the Road: Twenty Years with Cassady, Kerouac and Ginsberg. Black Spring Press, 1990.
 Challis, Chris. Quest for Kerouac. Faber & Faber, 1984.
 Charters, Ann. Kerouac. San Francisco: Straight Arrow Books, 1973.
 Charters, Ann (ed.). The Portable Beat Reader. New York: Penguin, 1992.
 Charters, Ann (ed.). The Portable Jack Kerouac. New York: Penguin, 1995.
 Christy, Jim. The Long Slow Death of Jack Kerouac. ECW Press, 1998.
 
 Clark, Tom. Jack Kerouac. Harcourt, Brace, Jovanovich, 1984.
 Coolidge, Clark. Now It's Jazz: Writings on Kerouac & the Sounds. Living Batch, 1999.
 Collins, Ronald & Skover, David. Mania: The Story of the Outraged & Outrageous Lives that Launched a Cultural Revolution (Top-Five Books, March 2013).
 Cook, Bruce. The Beat Generation. Charles Scribner's Sons, 1971. .
 
 Dale, Rick. The Beat Handbook: 100 Days of Kerouactions. Booksurge, 2008.
 Edington, Stephen. Kerouac's Nashua Roots. Transition, 1999.
 Ellis, R. J. Liar! Liar! Jack Kerouac – Novelist. Greenwich Exchange, 1999.
 French, Warren. Jack Kerouac. Boston: Twayne Publishers, 1986.
 Gaffié, Luc. Jack Kerouac: The New Picaroon. Postillion Press, 1975.
 Giamo, Ben. Kerouac, The Word and The Way. Southern Illinois University Press, 2000.
 Gifford, Barry. Kerouac's Town. Creative Arts, 1977.
 Gifford, Barry; Lee, Lawrence. Jack's Book: An Oral Biography of Jack Kerouac. St. Martin's Press, 1978. .
 Grace, Nancy M. Jack Kerouac and the Literary Imagination. Palgrave-macmillan, 2007.
 Goldstein, N. W. "Kerouac's On the Road. Explicator 50.1. 1991.
 Haynes, Sarah, "An Exploration of Jack Kerouac's Buddhism:Text and Life"
 Hemmer, Kurt. Encyclopedia of Beat Literature: The Essential Guide to the Lives and Works of the Beat Writers. Facts on File, Inc., 2007.
 Hipkiss, Robert A. Jack Kerouac: Prophet of the New Romanticism. Regents Press, 1976.
 Holmes, John Clellon. Visitor: Jack Kerouac in Old Saybrook. tuvoti, 1981.
 Holmes, John Clellon. Gone In October: Last Reflections on Jack Kerouac. Limberlost, 1985.
 Holton, Robert. On the Road: Kerouac's Ragged American Journey. Twayne, 1999.
 Hrebeniak, Michael. Action Writing: Jack Kerouac"s Wild Form. Carbondale IL., Southern Illinois UP, 2006.
 Huebel, Harry Russell. Jack Kerouac. Boise State University, 1979.available online
 Hunt, Tim. Kerouac's Crooked Road. Hamden: Archon Books, 1981.
 Jarvis, Charles. Visions of Kerouac. Ithaca Press, 1973.
 Johnson, Joyce. Minor Characters: A Young Woman's Coming-Of-Age in the Beat Orbit of Jack Kerouac. Penguin Books, 1999.
 Johnson, Joyce. Door Wide Open: A Beat Love Affair in Letters, 1957–1958. Viking, 2000.
 Johnson, Joyce. The Voice is All: The Lonely Victory of Jack Kerouac. Viking Press. 2012. 
 Johnson, Joyce. "Jack Kerouac’s Journey". The New York Review of Books, March 2, 2022.
 Johnson, Ronna C., "You're Putting Me On: Jack Kerouac and the Postmodern Emergence". College Literature. 27.1 2000.
 Jones, James T. A Map of Mexico City Blues: Jack Kerouac as Poet. Southern Illinois University Press, 1992.
 Jones, James T. Jack Kerouac's Duluoz Legend. Carbondale: Southern Illinois University Press, 1999.
 Jones, Jim. Use My Name: Kerouac's Forgotten Families. ECW Press, 1999.
 Jones, Jim. Jack Kerouac's Nine Lives. Elbow/Cityful Press, 2001.
 Kealing, Bob. Kerouac in Florida: Where the Road Ends. Arbiter Press, 2004.
 Kerouac, Joan Haverty. Nobody's Wife: The Smart Aleck and the King of the Beats. Creative Arts, 2000.
 Landefeld, Kurt. Jack's Memoirs: Off the Road, A Novel. Bottom Dog Press, 2014.
 Le Bihan, Adrien. Mon frère, Jack Kerouac, Le temps qu'il fait, 2018..
 Leland, John. Why Kerouac Matters: The Lessons of On the Road (They're Not What You Think). New York: Viking Press, 2007. .
 Maher Jr., Paul. Kerouac: His Life and Work. Lanham: Taylor Trade P, July 2004 .
 McNally, Dennis. Desolate Angel: Jack Kerouac, the Beat Generation, and America. Da Capo Press, 2003. .
 Montgomery, John. Jack Kerouac: A Memoir ...  Giligia Press, 1970.
 Montgomery, John. Kerouac West Coast. Fels & Firn Press, 1976.
 Montgomery, John. The Kerouac We Knew. Fels & Firn Press, 1982.
 Montgomery, John. Kerouac at the Wild Boar. Fels & Firn Press, 1986.
 Mortenson, Erik R. "Beating Time: Configurations of Temporality in Jack Kerouac's On the Road". College Literature 28.3. 2001.
 Motier, Donald. Gerard: The Influence of Jack Kerouac's Brother on his Life and Writing. Beaulieu Street Press, 1991.
 Nelson, Victoria. "Dark Journey into Light: On the Road with Jack Kerouac". Saint Austin Review (November/December 2014).
 Nicosia, Gerald. Kerouac: The Last Quarter Century. Noodlebrain Press, 2019.
 Nicosia, Gerald. Memory Babe: A Critical Biography of Jack Kerouac. Grove Press, 1983. Revised edition Noodlebrain Press, 2022.
 Nicosia, Gerald. One and Only: The Untold Story of On the Road. Viva Editions, 2011.
 Parker, Brad. "Jack Kerouac: An Introduction". Lowell Corporation for the Humanities, 1989.
 Swick, Thomas. South Florida Sun Sentinel. February 22, 2004. Article: "Jack Kerouac in Orlando".
 Theado, Matt. Understanding Jack Kerouac. Columbia: University of South Carolina, 2000.
 Turner, Steve. Angelheaded Hipster: A Life of Jack Kerouac. Viking Books, 1996. .
 Walsh, Joy, editor. Moody Street Irregulars: A Jack Kerouac Newsletter
 Weaver, Helen. The Awakener: A Memoir of Jack Kerouac and the Fifties. City Lights, 2009. . .
 Weinreich, Regina. The Spontaneous Poetics of Jack Kerouac. Southern Illinois University Press, 1987.
 Wills, David, editor. Beatdom Magazine. Mauling Press, 2007.

External links

Kerouac.net—An introduction to the life and work of Jack Kerouac, and the deep impact he had on our society and culture.
JackKerouac.com – The Jack and Stella Kerouac Center for the Public Humanities's website is an interactive storehouse and exhibition space dedicated to Jack Kerouac and connected topics.

Jack Kerouac Papers at the Rare Book & Manuscript Library at Columbia University
Jack Kerouac Papers, 1920–1977, held by the Henry W. and Albert A. Berg Collection of English and American Literature, New York Public Library
"Writings of Jack Kerouac" from C-SPAN's American Writers: A Journey Through History
The Kerouac Companion—The definitive key to the 600+ characters in Kerouac's novels.
sur-les-traces-de-kerouac Radio documentary by Gabriel Anctil ans Jean-Philippe Pleau on Radio-Canada (2015)
sur-les-traces-de-kerouac ebook by Gabriel Anctil & Marie-Sandrine Auger
Stuart A. Rose Manuscript, Archives, and Rare Book Library, Emory University: Jack Kerouac collection, 1950-1978
Stuart A. Rose Manuscript, Archives, and Rare Book Library, Emory University: Jack and Stella Sampas Kerouac papers,1940-1994
Stuart A. Rose Manuscript, Archives, and Rare Book Library, Emory University: John Sampas collection of Jack Kerouac material, circa 1900-2005

 
1922 births
1969 deaths
20th-century American male writers
20th-century American novelists
20th-century American poets
Alcohol-related deaths in Florida
American Buddhists
American male non-fiction writers
American male novelists
American male poets
American nomads
American people of Breton descent
American people of French-Canadian descent
American travel writers
American writers in French
Beat Generation writers
Buddhist poets
Catholics from Massachusetts
Columbia College (New York) alumni
Columbia Lions football players
Deaths from bleeding
English-language haiku poets
Exophonic writers
History of Denver
Military personnel from Massachusetts
North Beach, San Francisco
Novelists from Massachusetts
People from Ozone Park, Queens
People from the Upper West Side
People with schizoid personality disorder
Poets from Massachusetts
Travelers
United States Merchant Mariners
United States Navy reservists
United States Navy sailors
Writers from Lowell, Massachusetts